This is a list by date of birth of historically recognized American fine artists known for the creation of artworks that are primarily visual in nature, including traditional media such as painting, sculpture, photography, and printmaking, as well as more recent genres, including installation art, performance art, body art, conceptual art, digital art and video art.

Born 1900–1909
1900
 Samuel Cashwan (1900–1988), sculptor
 Carl Holty (1900–1973), painter
 Fred Kabotie (c. 1900–1986), painter, silversmith
 Rico Lebrun (1900–1964), painter
 Fannie Nampeyo (1900–1987), potter, ceramic artist
 Alice Neel (1900–1984), painter
 Betty Parsons (1900–1982), painter, gallerist
 Virginia True (1900–1989), painter
 Jack Tworkov (1900–1982), painter
 Adja Yunkers (1900–1983), painter

1901
 James Richmond Barthé (1901–1989), sculptor
 Francis Criss (1901–1973), painter
 Dorothy Dehner (1901–1994), sculptor, printmaker
 Beauford Delaney (1901–1979), painter
 Walt Disney (1901–1966), cartoonist, animator, filmmaker
 Thomas Brownell Eldred (1903–1993), painter, printmaker
 Philip Evergood (1901–1973), painter, printmaker, sculptor
 Greta Kempton (1901–1991), portrait artist
 Richard Lindner (1901–1978), painter
 Louise Emerson Ronnebeck (1901–1980), painter
 Esther Rose (1901–1990), painter, calligrapher
 Albert Swinden (1901–1961), painter
 John Augustus Walker (1901–1967), painter
 Elof Wedin (1901–1983), artist

1902
 Ansel Easton Adams (1902–1984), photographer
 Isabel Bishop (1902–1988), painter, printmaker
 Dorr Bothwell (1902–2000), painter, printmaker
 Alexander Cañedo (1902–1978), surrealism and magic realism
 Roger Wilson Dennis (1902–1996), painter, art conservator
 Lee Gatch (1902–1968), painter, muralist
 Donal Hord (1902–1966), sculptor
 Paul Kelpe (1902–1985), painter
 Kenzo Okada (1902–1982), painter
 I. Rice Pereira (1902–1971), painter
 Pietro Pezzati (1902–1993), painter
 Otis Polelonema (1902–1981), painter, illustrator
 Charles Pollock (1902–1988), painter
 Isaac Soyer (1902–1981), painter

1903
 Maxine Albro (1903–1966), painter, muralist, lithographer, mosaic artist, sculptor
 Walter Inglis Anderson (1903–1965), painter
 Joseph Cornell (1903–1972), sculptor, filmmaker
 Vestie Davis (1903–1978), self-taught artist
 Elwood Decker (1903–1992), painter
 Stephen Etnier (1903–1984), painter
 Walker Evans (1903–1975), photographer
 Adolph Gottlieb (1903–1974), painter
 Robert Gwathmey (1903–1988), painter
 Al Hirschfeld (1903–2003), caricaturist
 Leon Karp (1903–1951), painter and printmaker
 Seymour Lipton (1903–1986), sculptor
 Charles S. Martz (1903–1966), painter and photographer
 Isamu Noguchi (1903–1988), sculptor
 Mark Rothko (1903–1970), painter
 Louis Schanker (1903–1981), painter
 Ethel Schwabacher (1903–1984), painter
 Bernarda Bryson Shahn (1903–2004), painter, lithographer
 Karl Zerbe (1903–1972), painter

1904
 Margaret Bourke-White (1904–1971), photographer
 Hans Burkhardt (1904–1994), painter
 Paul Cadmus (1904–1999), painter, printmaker
 Clarence Holbrook Carter (1904–2000), painter
 Arshile Gorky (1904–1948), painter
 Chaim Gross (1904–1991), sculptor
 Murray Hantman (1904–1999), painter and muralist
 Peter Hurd (1904–1984), painter
 Willem de Kooning (1904–1997), painter
 Fletcher Martin (1904–1979), painter
 Nan Phelps (1904–1990), painter
 Jose de Rivera (1904–1985), sculptor
 Clyfford Still (1904–1980), painter

1905
 Leonard Bahr (1905–1990), painter, muralist, illustrator
 Grace Clements (1905–1969), muralist, mosaicist, art critic
 Perle Fine (1905–1988), painter
 Jared French (1905–1988), painter
 Forrest Hibbits (1905–1996), watercolor painter, illustrator
 Winnifred Hudson (1905–1996), abstract painter 
 Lois Mailou Jones (1905–1998), painter
 Martin W. Kellogg (1905–1989), portrait painter
 Doris Lee (1905–1983), painter
 Joseph Meert (1905 - 1989), painter, muralist, printmaker
 Paul Meltsner (1905–1966), painter
 Barnett Newman (1905–1970), painter
 Sanford Plummer (1905–1974), watercolor painter
 James Amos Porter (1905–1970), painter, art historian
 Anton Refregier (1905–1979), painter
 Kurt Roesch (1905–1984), painter
 Ray Strong (1905–2006), painter

1906
 Harry Anderson (1906–1996), painter and illustrator
 Peter Blume (1906–1992), painter
 James Brooks (1906–1992), painter and muralist
 Ralston Crawford (1906–1978), painter, lithographer, and photographer
 Burgoyne Diller (1906–1965), painter
 Herbert Ferber (1906–1991), sculptor
 Crockett Johnson (1906-1975), cartoonist, illustrator, mathematical painter
 Philip Johnson (1906–2005), architect, art collector
 Henry E McDaniel (1906-2008), painter
 Dorothy Morang (1906–1994), painter and pastelist
 David Smith (1906–1965), sculptor
 Leon Polk Smith (1906–1996), painter

1907
 Charles Alston (1907–1977), painter
 Acee Blue Eagle (1907–1959), painter, muralist
 Ilya Bolotowsky (1907–1981), painter, printmaker
 Marie Z. Chino (1907–1982), potter, ceramic artist
 Constance Edith Fowler (1907–1996), painter, printmaker
 Jon Gnagy (1907–1981), painter, illustrator, television art instructor
 Jacob Kainen (1909–2001), painter
 Albert Kotin (1907–1980), painter
 Tom Lea (1907–2001), muralist, illustrator, painter
 Michael Loew (1907–1985), painter
 Harry Mintz (1907–2002), painter
 Walter Tandy Murch (1907–1967), painter
 Fairfield Porter (1907–1975), painter
 Gregorio Prestopino (1907–1984), painter
 George Rickey (1907–2002), sculptor
 Theodore Roszak (1907–1981), sculptor, painter
 Millard Sheets (1907–1989), painter
 Bernard Joseph Steffen (1907–1980), painter, printmaker
 Henriette Wyeth (1907–1997), painter

1908
 Claire Falkenstein (1908–1997), sculptor
 Sybil Gibson (1908–1995), painter
 Herblock (1908–2001), political cartoonist
 Lee Krasner (1908–1984), painter
 Helen Lundeberg (1908–1999), painter
 Nicholas Marsicano (1908–1991), painter
 George McNeil (1908–1995), painter
 Wilber Moore Stilwell (1908–1974), depression era artist
 Roger Tory Peterson (1908–1996), graphic artist, illustrator, naturalist
 Minor White (1908–1976), photographer

1909
 Gertrude Abercrombie (1909–1977), Surrealist painter
 Jean Cory Beall, (1909–1978), painter and public artist
 Al Capp (1909–1979), cartoonist
 Ettore "Ted" DeGrazia (1909–1982), impressionist painter, sculptor, and lithographer
 Enrico Donati (1909–2008), painter
 Jacob Lipkin (1909–1996), sculptor
 Cornelia MacIntyre Foley (1909–2010), painter
 Charles Gordon (1909–1978), watercolor artist
 Dorothy Stratton King (1909–2007), painter and printmaker
 Norman Lewis (1909–1979), painter
 Alex Raymond (1909–1956), cartoonist
 Herman Rose (1909–2007), painter
 Manfred Schwartz (1909–1970), painter
 Fay Morgan Taylor (1909–1990), modernist artist

Born 1910–1919
1910
 Leonard Bocour (1910–1993), paint-maker, painter
 Paul Feeley (1910–1966), painter
 James FitzGerald (1910–1973), sculptor, painter
 Morris Graves (1910–2001), painter, printmaker
 Hiroshi Honda (1910–1970), painter
 Franz Kline (1910–1962), painter
 Fuller Potter (1910–1990), painter
 Mitchell Siporin (1910–1976), painter
 Hedda Sterne (1910–2011), painter
 Dorothea Tanning (1910–2012), painter, surrealist

1911
 Arnold Arbeit (1911–1974), architect, sculptor, painter
 Will Barnet (1911–2012), painter, printmaker
 Romare Bearden (1911–1988), painter, printmaker
 Louise Bourgeois (1911–2010), sculptor, printmaker
 Eleanor Layfield Davis (1911–1985), painter, sculptor
 John McCrady (1911–1968), painter
 Carl Morris (1911–1993), painter, muralist
 Hilda Grossman Morris (1911–1991), sculptor
 David Park (1911–1960), painter
 Kara Shepherd (1911–1984), surrealist painter
 Kurt Sluizer (1911–1988), painter

1912
 Charles Addams (1912–1988), cartoonist
 William Baziotes (1912–1963), painter
 William Congdon (1912–1998), painter
 William Franklin Draper (1912–2003), painter
 Fay Kleinman (1912–2012), painter
 Ida Kohlmeyer (1912–1997), painter, sculptor
 Alexander Liberman (1912–1999), painter, sculptor
 Morris Louis (1912–1962), painter
 Agnes Martin (1912–2004), painter
 Phillip Pavia (1912–2005), sculptor
 Jackson Pollock (1912–1956), painter
 Raymond Francis Robbins (1912–1980), intricate realist paintings
 Walter Sanford (1912–1987), artist
 Tony Smith (1912–1980), sculptor
 George Sugarman (1912–1999), sculptor
 Carl Thorp (1912–1989), impressionist landscapes

1913
 Peter Agostini (1913–1993)
 Ralph Leon Bagley (1913–2008), artist and art instructor
 Harold Black, painter, muralist
 Hyman Bloom (1913–2009), painter
 Lawrence Calcagno (1913–1993), painter
 Robert Capa (1913–1954), photographer
 Mary Gehr (1913–1997), painter and printmaker
 Philip Guston (1913–1980), painter, printmaker
 Reuben Kadish (1913–1992), sculptor
 James Kelly (1913–2003), painter
 Ibram Lassaw (1913–2003), sculptor
 Conrad Marca-Relli (1913–2000), collage artist, painter
 Mercedes Matter (1913–2001), painter
 Ruthe Katherine Pearlman (1913–2007), painter and art educator
 Ad Reinhardt (1913–1967), painter
 Bettina Steinke (1913–1999), painter and muralist

1914
 Glen Alps (1914–1996), printmaker, sculptor
 Ward Brackett (1914–2006), illustrator
 Nassos Daphnis (1914–2010), painter
 Allan Houser (1914–1994), painter, sculptor
 Gwendolyn Knight (1914–2005), painter
 Tony Rosenthal (1914–2009), sculptor
 Charles Shannon (1914–1996), painter
 Alton Tobey (1914–2005), painter, muralist, illustrator
 Emerson Woelffer (1914–2003), painter

1915
 Elizabeth Catlett (1915–2012), sculptor, printmaker
 Claude Clark (1915–2001), painter
 John Rogers Cox (1915–1990), painter
 Edward Dugmore (1915–1996), painter
 Friedel Dzubas (1915–1994), painter
 Ruth Gikow (1915–1982), muralist
 Sam Golden (1915–1997), paint-maker, painter
 Bob Kane (1915–1998), cartoonist
 Jack Levine (1915–2010), painter
 Clayton Lewis (1915–1995), painter and sculptor
 Richard Lippold (1915–2002), sculptor
 Nellie Meadows (1915–2006), artist
 Robert Motherwell (1915–1991), painter, printmaker
 Hans Namuth (1915–1990), photographer

1916
 Adolf Aldrich (1916–2010), printmaker
 Elmer Bischoff (1916–1991), painter
 Warren Eugene Brandon (1916–1977), painter
 Eyvind Earle (1916–2000), painter
 Leonard Edmondson (1916–2002) painter, printmaker
 Joseph Goto (1916–1994), sculptor
 Karl Kasten (1916–2010), painter, printmaker
 Ethel Magafan (1916–1993), painter
 Montyne (1916–1989)
 Alfonso Ossorio (1916–1990), painter, collagist
 Eunice Parsons (born 1916),  modernist collagist
 Paul Penczner (1916–2010), painter
 Richard Pousette-Dart (1916–1992), painter
 Jon Schueler (1916–1992), painter
 Sylvia Sleigh (1916–2010), painter
 Reuben Tam (1916–1991), painter

1917
 Kathleen Gemberling Adkison (1917–2010), abstract expressionist painter
 Albert Alcalay (1917–2008), painter
 Nicolas Carone (1917–2010), painter
 Maya Deren (1917–1961), avant-garde filmmaker and theorist, photographer
 Manny Farber (1917–2008), painter, film critic
 Edith Frohock (1917–1997), painter and printmaker
 Robert Goodnough (1917–2010), painter
 Stephen Greene (1917–1999), painter
 David Hare (1917–1992), sculptor and photographer
 Jacob Lawrence (1917–2000), painter, printmaker
 Louisa Matthíasdóttir (1917–2000), painter
 Malcolm H. Myers (1917–2002), painter and printmaker
 Milton Resnick (1917–2004), painter
 Robert Richenburg (1917–2006), painter 
 Syd Solomon (1917–2004), painter
 Andrew Wyeth (1917–2009), painter

1918
 Ronald Bladen (1918–1988), sculptor 
 Cornell Capa (1918–2008), photographer
 Keith Crown (1918–2010), abstract painter
 Elaine de Kooning (1918–1989), painter
 Jane Frank (1918–1986), painter
 Cleve Gray (1918–2004), painter
 Stephen Pace (1918–2010), painter
 David Foster Pratt (1918–2010), painter
 Joseph Rajer (1918-1976), printmaker
 Gerard Francis Tempest (1918–2009), painter and sculptor
 Charles Banks Wilson (1918–2013), painter

1919
 Theophilus Brown (1919–2012), painter
 Fritz Bultman (1919–1985), painter, sculptor
 Edward Corbett (1919–1971), painter
 Frederick Hammersley (1919–2009), painter
 Lester Johnson (1919–2010), painter
 Irving Kriesberg (1919–2009), painter
 Alden Mason (1919–2013), painter
 Lee Mullican (1919–1998), painter
 John Wilde (1919–2006), painter, draughtsman, printmaker

Born 1920–1929
1920
 John Coplans (1920–2003), painter, photographer
 Gene Davis (1920–1985), painter, printmaker
 Jimmy Ernst (1920–1984), painter
 Elaine Hamilton (1920–2010), painter
 Ray Harryhausen (1920–2013), stop-motion animator, sculptor
 Luchita Hurtado (1920–2020), painter
 Herbert Katzman (1923-2004), painter
 Eugene Mackaben (1920–1984), painter
 Roger Medearis (1920–2001), painter
 Albert Nemethy (1920–1998), painter
 Honoré Desmond Sharrer (1920–2009), painter
 Wayne Thiebaud (1920–2021), painter, printmaker
 George Tooker (1920–2011), painter
 Hannah Tompkins (1920–1995), painter, printmaker
 Paul Wonner (1920–2008), painter

1921
 Herbert Abrams (1921–2003), painter
 Gertrude Bleiberg (1921–2001), painter
 Norman Bluhm (1921–1999), painter
 Edward Boccia (1921–2012), painter 
 William Brice (1921–2008), painter
 Thomas Chimes (1921–2009), painter
 Lillian Desow-Fishbein (1921–2004), painter
 Norris Embry (1921–1981), painter
 Salvatore Grippi (1921–2017), painter, printmaker
 Charles Li Hidley (1921–2003), abstract expressionist
 Al Jaffee (born 1921), cartoonist
 Frank Lobdell (1921–2013), painter
 Joe Stefanelli (1921–2017), painter
 Anne Truitt (1921–2004), sculptor
 Ralph Burke Tyree (1921–1979), painter
 Leona Wood (1921–2008), painter

1922
 Leonard Baskin (1922–2000), sculptor, printmaker
 Leland Bell (1922–1991), painter
 Nell Blaine (1922–1996), painter
 Robert De Niro, Sr. (1922–1993), painter
 Virginia Dehn (née Engleman) (1922–2005), painter and printmaker
 Richard Diebenkorn (1922–1993), painter, printmaker
 Kahlil Gibran (1922–2008), sculptor, inventor, painter
 Helen Gilbert (1922–2002), painter and kinetic sculptor
 Charlotte Gilbertson (1922–2014), painter, printmaker
 Leon Golub (1922–2004), painter
 Grace Hartigan (1922–2008), painter
 Julius Hatofsky (1922–2006), painter
 John Hultberg (1922–2005), painter
 Matsumi Kanemitsu (1922–1992), painter and lithographer
 Albert Kresch (1922-2022), painter
 Harvey Littleton (1922–2013), glass artist
 Stan Masters (1922–2005), painter
 Jules Olitski (1922–2007), painter
 Ray Parker (1922–1990), painter
 Charles Cropper Parks (1922–2012), sculptor
 Haywood Rivers (1922–2001), painter
 Theodoros Stamos (1922–1997), painter
 Richard Stankiewicz (1922–1983)
 Jim Steg (1922–2001), printmaker, collage artist
 H. C. Westermann (1922–1981), sculptor

1923
 Diane Arbus (1923–1971), photographer
 David Aronson (1923–2015), painter
 Richard Artschwager (1923–2013), painter, sculptor
 Robert Beauchamp (1923–1995), painter
 Erlena Chisolm Bland (1923–2009), painter
 John Boatright (1923–2006), painter
 Ernest Briggs (1923–1984), painter
 John Ery Coleman (1923–1993), painter
 Jess Collins (1923–2004), painter, collage artist
 Sam Francis (1923–1994), painter, printmaker
 Charles Garabedian (1923–2016), painter
 Paul Georges (1923–2002), painter
 Shirley Jaffe (1923–2016), painter
 Paul Jenkins (1923–2012), painter
 Ellsworth Kelly (1923–2015), painter, printmaker
 Jonah Kinigstein (born 1923), painter
 Roy Lichtenstein (1923–1997), painter, sculptor, printmaker
 Knox Martin (1923—2022), painter, sculptor, muralist
 Fred Mitchell (1923–2013), painter
 Ruth Mountaingrove (1923–2016), feminist photographer and poet
 Larry Rivers (1923–2002), painter

1924
 John Bageris (1924–2000), artist
 Al Blaustein (1924–2004), painter and printmaker
 George Brecht (1924–2008), Fluxus artist, composer
 Gandy Brodie (1924–1975), painter
 Robert Frank (1924–2019), filmmaker, photographer
 Jane Freilicher (1924–2014), painter
 Michael Goldberg (1924–2007), painter
 Douglas Huebler (1924–1997), conceptual artist
 James Jarvaise (1924–2015), painter
 Chris Karras (1924–2014), painter
 LaVerne Krause (1924–1987), printmaker, painter
 John Levee (1924–2017), painter
 Kenneth Noland (1924–2010), painter
 Philip Pearlstein (1924–2022), painter, printmaker
 Beverly Pepper (1924–2020), sculptor, painter
 George Segal (1924–2000), sculptor
 Kendall Shaw (1924–2019), painter
 Peter Voulkos (1924–2002), ceramic artist
 Charles Waterhouse (1924–2013), painter, illustrator and sculptor
 Jane Wilson (1924–2015)

1925
 John Altoon (1925–1969), painter
 Karl Benjamin (1925–2012), painter
 Robert Colescott (1925–2009), painter
 Nita Engle (1925–2019), watercolor painter
 Len Gridley Everett (1925–1984), painter
 Joseph Glasco (1925–1996), painter
 Duane Hanson (1925–1996), sculptor
 Lila Katzen (1925–1998) sculptor
 Joan Mitchell (1925–1992), painter, printmaker
 Robert Rauschenberg (1925–2008), all media
 Emmett Williams (1925–2007), collage artist, concrete poet

1926

 Stephen Antonakos (1926–2013), sculptor, light artist
 Hannelore Baron (1926–1987), collage artist
 Wallace Berman (1926–1976), assemblage artist
 Stanley Boxer (1926–2000), painter
 Edward Clark (1926–2019), painter
 Rosalyn Drexler (born 1926), painter
 Sonia Gechtoff (1926–2018), painter 
 Everett Raymond Kinstler (1926–2019), painter
 Ellen Lanyon (1926–2013), painter
 Ed Moses (1926–2018), painter
 Elva Nampeyo (1926–1985), potter, ceramic artist
 George Earl Ortman (1926–2015), painter
 Roland Petersen (born 1926), painter
 Betye Saar (born 1926), assemblage artist
 Charles Seliger (1926–2009), painter
 Nancy Spero (1926–2009), painter, printmaker, collage artist
 Don Stivers (1926–2009), painter
 Beth Van Hoesen (1926–2010), printmaker
 Jack Youngerman (1926–2020), painter

1927
 James Bishop (1927–2021), painter
 Jack Boul (born 1927), painter, sculptor and printmaker
 Lilian Thomas Burwell (born 1927), painter and sculptor
 Richard Callner (1927–2007), painter
 John Chamberlain (1927–2011), sculptor
 Tony DeLap (1927–2019), sculptor
 Peter Forakis (1927–2009), sculptor
 Al Hansen (1927–1995), performance artist, collage artist, Fluxus artist
 Ray Johnson (1927–1995), collage artist, mail artist
 Wolf Kahn (1927–2020), painter
 Allan Kaprow (1927–2006), painter, assemblagist, performance artist
 Alex Katz (born 1927), painter, printmaker
 Edward Kienholz (1927–1994), installation artist, sculptor
 Alfred Leslie (1927-2023), painter
 John Mason (1927–2019), ceramic artist
 Eleanore Mikus (1927–2017), painter
 Jack Roth (1927–2004), painter
 William Scharf (1927–2018), painter
 Lillian Schwartz (born 1927), Digital artist
 Kenneth Snelson (1927–2016), sculptor
 Anne Tabachnick (1927–1995), painter
 John Paul Thomas (1927–2001), painter
 Reynolds Thomas (1927–1991), painter
 Ernest Trova (1927–2009), sculptor

1928
 Pat Adams (born 1928), painter
 Arman (1928–2005), painter, sculptor, experimental artist
 Alice Baber (1928–1982), painter
 Yoong Bae (1928–1992), painter and sculptor
 Allyn Bromley (born 1928), printmaker
 Rolando López Dirube (1928–1997), artist
 Thomas Downing (1928–1985), painter
 Ken Ferguson (1928–2005), ceramist
 Helen Frankenthaler (1928–2011), painter, printmaker
 Ralph Goings (1928–2016), painter
 Wally Hedrick (1928–2003), painter, collage artist
 Al Held (1928–2005), painter, printmaker
 Robert Indiana (1928–2018), painter, sculptor, printmaker
 Robert Irwin (born 1928), installation artist
 Donald Judd (1928–1994), sculptor
 Sol LeWitt (1928–2007), conceptual artist, installation artist, sculptor, printmaker
 Brian O'Doherty, aka Patrick Ireland (born 1928), sculptor, painter, installation artist, conceptual artist
 Nathan Oliveira (1928–2010), painter, printmaker
 Pat Passlof (1928–2011), painter 
 Wendell Thompson Perkins (1928–1997), painter
 Dextra Nampeyo Quotskuyva (born 1928), potter, ceramic artist
 Paul Resika (born 1928), painter
 Betty Sabo (1928–2016), landscape painter and sculptor
 David Simpson (born 1928), painter
 Julian Stanczak (1928–2017), painter
 Anthony Triano (1928–1997), painter, sculptor, and illustrator
 Cy Twombly (1928–2011), painter, sculptor
 Andy Warhol (1928–1987), painter, filmmaker, printmaker
 John Wesley (1928–2022), painter

1929
 Ida Applebroog (born 1929), painter
 Jo Baer (born 1929), painter
 John Button (1929–1982), painter
 Robert d’Arista (1929–1987), painter
 Jay DeFeo (1929–1989), painter, visual artist
 Jules Feiffer (born 1929), cartoonist
 Jackie Ferrara (born 1929), sculptor
 Vassilios Giavis (1929–2019), historical illustrator
 Howard Kanovitz (1929–2009), painter
 Lyman Kipp (1929–2014), sculptor
 Nicholas Krushenick (1929–1999), painter
 Gabriel Laderman (1929–2011), painter
 Clement Meadmore (1929–2005), sculptor
 Claes Oldenburg (1929–2022), sculptor
 Charles O. Perry (1929–2011), sculptor
 Raquel Rabinovich (born 1929), painter, sculptor
 Neil Welliver (1929–2005), painter

Born 1930–1939
1930
 Richard Anuszkiewicz (1930–2020), painter, sculptor, printmaker
 Robert Arneson (1930–1992), sculptor, ceramist
 William H. Bailey (1930–2020), painter
 James E. Brewton (1930–1967), painter, printmaker
 Harold Bruder (born 1930), realist painter
 Annette Corcoran (born 1930), graphic artist and ceramist
 Allan D'Arcangelo (1930–1998), painter, graphic artist, printmaker
 Marisol Escobar (1930–2016), sculptor, printmaker
 Helen Frank (born 1930), painter, printmaker
 Judith Godwin (1930–2021), painter 
 Ron Gorchov (1930–2020), painter
 Jasper Johns (born 1930), painter, sculptor, printmaker
 Ken Kerslake (1930–2006), printmaker, painter
 Howard Kottler (1930–1989), ceramist, sculpture
 Lee Lozano (1930–1999), painter
 Robert Natkin (1930–2010), painter
 Manuel Neri (1930–2021), sculptor, painter
 Walter Pashko (1930–2006), surrealism
 Deborah Remington (1930–2010), painter, printmaker
 Faith Ringgold (born 1930), painter and fabric artist
 Robert Ryman (1930–2019), painter
 Anita Steckel (1930–2012), graphic artist
 Susan Weil (born 1930), painter
 Gahan Wilson (1930–2019), cartoonist

1931
 Helene Aylon, (1931–2020), painter
 John Baldessari (1931–2020), conceptual artist, printmaker
 John Balossi (1931–2007), painter and sculptor
 John Nelson Battenberg (1931–2012)
 Jack Beal (1931–2013), painter
 Lee Bontecou (born 1931), sculptor, printmaker
 Stan Dann (1931–2013), wood sculptor
 Audrey Flack (born 1931), painter
 Rolland Golden (1931–2019), abstract realist painter
 R.C. Gorman (1931–2005), painter
 Raymond Han (1931–2017), painter
 Fred Holle (born 1931), artist and educator
 Budd Hopkins (1931–2011), painter
 Howard Mehring (1931–1978), painter
 Malcolm Morley (1931–2019), painter, printmaker
 Robert Morris (1931–2019), sculptor, conceptual artist
 Marjorie Strider (1931–2014), sculptor
 Tom Wesselmann (1931–2004), painter, collage artist

1932
 Alan Bean (1932–2018), former American astronaut, painter
 Robert Bechtle (1932–2020), painter
 Emilie Benes Brzezinski (born 1932), sculptor
 James Lee Byars (1932–1997), installation artist, sculptor, performance artist
 Richard Estes (born 1932), painter, printmaker
 Ron Ferri (1932–2019), digital artist
 Charles Hinman (born 1932), painter
 Morris Katz (1932–2010), painter
 Craig Kauffman (1932–2010), painter, sculptor
 Emily Mason (1932–2019), painter
 Nora Chapa Mendoza (born 1932), abstract painter
 Nam June Paik (1932–2006), Fluxus, installation artist
 Dorothea Rockburne (born 1932), painter
 Harry Tsuchidana (born 1932), abstract painter

1933

 William Anastasi (born 1933), painter
 George Bogart (1933–2005), painter
 Kenneth Wayne Bushnell (1933–2020), visual artist
 Albert Contreras (1933–2017), painter
 Chryssa (1933–2013), sculptor
 Guy Coheleach (born 1933), painter
 Bruce Conner (1933–2008), filmmaker, assemblage artist, sculptor, painter, collagist, graphic artist and photographer
 Mary Beth Edelson (1933-2021), artist
 Dale Eldred (1933–1993), sculptor
 Dan Flavin (1933–1996), sculptor
 Sam Gilliam (1933–2022), painter, printmaker
 Carol Haerer (1933–2002), painter
 Phillip Hefferton (1933–2008)
 John Stuart Ingle (1933–2010), watercolorist
 Alison Knowles (born 1933), Fluxus performance artist, sound artist, papermaker, printmaker
 Charlotte Moorman (1933–1991), Fluxus, performance artist
 Ree Morton (1933–1977), painter, sculptor
 Yoko Ono (born 1933), installation artist, sculptor, filmmaker
 Joseph Raffael (1933–2021), painter
 James Rosenquist (1933–2017), painter and muralist, printmaker
 Joe Shannon (born 1933), painter
 Stephen De Staebler (1933–2011), sculptor
 Michelle Stuart (born 1933), painter, sculptor, photographer
 Mark di Suvero (born 1933), sculptor
 Paul Thek (1933–1988), installation, painting, sculpture

1934
 Don Bachardy (born 1934), portrait artist
 Colette Bangert (born 1934), new media artist
 Walter Darby Bannard (1934–2016), painter
 Bill Barrett (born 1934), sculptor, painter
 Billy Al Bengston (born 1934), painter, sculptor
 Helen Bershad (born 1934), abstract expressionist painter
 Llyn Foulkes (born 1934), painter
 James Gill (born 1934), painter
 Anita Huffington (born 1934), sculptor
 Yvonne Jacquette (born 1934), painter, printmaker
 Joni T. Johnson (1934–1988), painter
 John McCracken (1934–2011), sculptor
 Jay Milder (born 1934), painter
 Forrest Moses (1934–2021), abstract landscape painter
 Irving Petlin (1934–2018), painter
 Gloria Plevin (born 1934), painter
 Yvonne Rainer (born 1934), performance artist, choreographer, dancer
 Peter Saul (born 1934), painter
 Selina Trieff (1934–2015), abstract artist
 Harold Joe Waldrum (1934–2003), painter, photographer
 Neil Williams (1934–1988), painter

1935
 Carl Andre (born 1935), minimalist sculptor
 Eleanor Antin (born 1935), performance artist, filmmaker, installation artist
 Christo (1935–2020), environmental installation artist
 Walter De Maria (1935–2013), sculptor
 Jim Dine (born 1935), painter, sculptor, printmaker
 Simmie Knox (born 1935), portrait artist 
 Al Loving (1935–2005), painter
 Ben Fortunado Marcune (born 1935), figurative and representational sculptor and painter
 Chuck Oberstein (1935–2002), clown paintings
 Kenneth Price (1935–2012), ceramist
 Joseph Rael (born 1935), artist and writer
 Mel Ramos (1935–2018), painter
 Hib Sabin (born 1935), sculptor
 Stanley Tomshinsky (1935–2004), artist
 Carol Wald (1935–2000), artist and illustrator

1936
 Edward Avedisian (1936–2007), painter
 Hollis Frampton (1936–1984), experimental filmmaker, photographer, theorist
 Gregory Gillespie (1936–2000), painter
 Hans Haacke (born 1936), conceptual artist
 Richard Haas (born 1936), muralist
 Eva Hesse (1936–1970), sculptor
 Tom Holland (born 1936), painter, mixed media
 Dennis Hopper (1936–2010), actor, photographer, painter, other media
 Joan Jonas (born 1936), video, performance artist, other media
 Evan Lindquist (born 1936), printmaker
 Doug Ohlson (1936–2010), painter 
 Richard Pionk (1936–2007), pastellist, painter
 Lucas Samaras (born 1936), photographer, sculptor, printmaker
 Frank Stella (born 1936), painter, printmaker
 DeWain Valentine (1936-2022), sculptor
 Leo Valledor (1936–1989), painter
 Carlos Villa (1936–2013), painter
 Thornton Willis (born 1936), painter

1937
 Peter Campus (born 1937), video artist, photographer
 Reginald Case (1937–2009), painter, collagist, sculptor
 Ronald Davis (born 1937), painter
 Eugene Gregan (born 1937), painter
 Red Grooms (born 1937), multimedia artist, printmaker
 Carolyn Heller (1937–2011), painter and decorative artist
 LeRoy Johnson (born 1937) painter, sculptor, collagist
 Robert Mangold (born 1937), painter, printmaker
 Peter Max (born 1937), printmaker, graphic designer
 Larry Poons (born 1937), painter
 Harvey Quaytman (1937–2002), painter 
 Charles Ross (born 1937), sculptor
 Edward Ruscha (born 1937), painter, printmaker, photographer, conceptual artist
 Fritz Scholder (1937–2005), painter, printmaker, graphic artist
 Bob Thompson (1937–1966), painter
 William T. Wiley (1937–2021), painter, printmaker
 Marlene Tseng Yu (born 1937), abstract expressionist
 Richard Van Buren, (born 1937), sculptor
 Larry Zox (1937–2006), painter

1938

 Fran Bull (born 1938), painter, printmaker, sculptor, installation artist
 Joan Brown (1938–1990), painter
 Vija Celmins (born 1938), painter, graphic artist, printmaker
 Janet Fish (born 1938), painter
 Robert Graham (1938–2008), sculptor
 Dick Higgins (1938–1998), Fluxus artist, composer, writer
 Nancy Holt (1938–2014), sculptor, installation and earth artist
 Robert H. Hudson (born 1938), sculptor
 Stephanie Oursler (born 1938), visual artist and political activist
 Brice Marden (born 1938), painter, printmaker
 Eugene J. Martin (1938–2005), collagist, painter, graphic artist
 Clark Murray (born 1938), sculptor, painter
 Stephen Howard Naegle (born 1938), watercolor artist
 Jim Nutt (born 1938), painter
 Dennis Oppenheim (1938–2011), sculptor, installation and earth artist
 Robert Perless (born 1938), kinetic artist
 Ben Sakoguchi (born 1938)
 Richard Serra (born 1938), sculptor, printmaker
 Robert Smithson (1938–1973), sculptor, installation and earth artist
 Dieterich Spahn (born 1938), painter, stained glass designer

1939
 Peter Alexander (1939–2020), sculptor
 Larry Bell (born 1939), sculptor
 Jake Berthot (1939–2014), painter
 Scott Burton (1939–1989), sculptor
 Rosemarie Castoro (1939–2015), painter, sculptor
 Judy Chicago (born 1939), installation artist, sculptor
 William Eggleston (born 1939), photographer
 Louise Fishman (1939–2021), painter
 Edward J. Fraughton (born 1939), sculptor, inventor
 Nancy Graves (1939–1995), sculptor, painter, printmaker
 Margia Kramer (born 1939), interdisciplinary mixed-media artist
 Robert Lostutter (born 1939), painter
 Ed Paschke (1939–2004), painter, printmaker
 Carolee Schneemann (1939–2019), performance artist
 Paul Shapiro (born 1939), Abstract Expressionist and landscape painter
 Diane Tuckman (born 1939), silk painter
 Igor Tulipanov (born 1939), painter
 Mierle Laderman Ukeles (born 1939), feminist artist, installation artist
 Jack Whitten (1939–2018), painter

Born 1940–1949

1940
 Vito Acconci (1940–2017), conceptual artist, installation artist, performance artist, filmmaker
 Mel Bochner (born 1940), conceptual artist
 James Bohary (born 1940)
 Gary Bower (born 1940), painter
 Chuck Close (1940–2021), painter, printmaker
 John Connell (1940–2009), painter, sculptor, printmaker
 Mimi Gross (born 1940), painter
 Paul Havas (1940–2012), landscape painter
 Harvey Konigsberg (born 1940), artist
 Paul Laffoley (1940–2015), artist
 Elizabeth Murray (1940–2007), painter, printmaker
 Gladys Nilsson (born 1940), painter
 Jaune Quick-To-See Smith (born 1940), painter, printmaker
 Barbara Rossi (born 1940), painter
 Ernest Ruckle (1940–2018), visual artist
 Steven L. Sles (born 1940), artist
 Joan Snyder (born 1940), painter
 Pat Steir (born 1940), painter
 Mym Tuma (born 1940), painter, mixed media
 Hannah Wilke (1940–1993), all media
 Peter Young (born 1940), painter

1941
 Jennifer Bartlett (born 1941), painter
 Lynda Benglis (born 1941), sculptor
 Tony Berlant (born 1941), mixed-media artist
 Karen Breschi (born 1941), ceramic artist
 Gary Hugh Brown (born 1941), painter
 Dale Chihuly (born 1941), glass sculptor
 John De Andrea (born 1941), sculptor
 Peter Erskine (born 1941), light sculptor
 André Harvey (1941–2018), sculptor
 Renne Hughes (1941–1991), painter and photographer
 Mary Kelly (born 1941), conceptual artist
 William Leavitt (born 1941), conceptual artist, painter, installation artist 
 Pat Lipsky (born 1941), painter
 Judith Lodge (born 1941), painter and photographer
 Forrest Myers (born 1941), sculptor
 Bruce Nauman (born 1941), installation artist, video artist, printmaker
 Martin Puryear (born 1941), sculptor, printmaker
 Anita Rodriguez (born 1941), artist incorporating ingenious ceremonialism and mysticism
 John Seery (born 1941), painter
 Keith Sonnier (1941–2020), sculptor
 Richard Tuttle (born 1941), sculptor, painter, installation artist
 Jackie Winsor (born 1941), sculptor
 Joe Zucker (born 1941), mixed-media artist

1942
 Judith Bernstein (born 1942), feminist artist
 Jonathan Borofsky (born 1942), painter, sculptor, installation artist
 Jerry Dolyn Brown (1942–2016), folk artist, potter
 Rhea Carmi (born 1942), abstract expressionist and mixed-media artist
 Dan Christensen (1942–2007), painter
 Susan Crile (born 1942), painter
 Porfirio DiDonna (1942–1986), painter
 Lucien Dulfan (born 1942), conceptual artist
 Dan Graham (1942-2022), conceptual artist, performance artist
 Jann Haworth (born 1942), sculptor
 Michael Kabotie (1942–2009), painter, silversmith
 Harry McCormick (born 1942) interior spaces painter
 Bob Ross (1942–1995), painter, television artist
 David True (born 1942), painter
 Lawrence Weiner (1942–2021), conceptual artist
 William T. Williams (born 1942), painter

1943
 Michael Asher (1943–2012), conceptual artist, installation artist
 Sandra Bowden (born 1943), painter
 Robert Butler (1943–2014), painter
 Pauline Campanelli (1943–2001), painter, writer
 Cora Cohen (born 1943), painter
 Ron Cooper (born 1943), artist
 Robert Crumb (born 1943), cartoonist
 David Diao (born 1943), painter
 William S. Dutterer (1943–2007), painter
 Simon Gaon (born 1943), painter
 David Hammons (born 1943), installation artist, sculptor
 Helen Hardin (1943–1984), painter
 Steven Kemenyffy (born 1943), ceramic artist
 Stephen Kline (born 1943), painter, photographer, pen and ink
 Gordon Matta-Clark (1943–1978), situationist, site-specific artist, performance artist
 David R. Prentice (born 1943), painter
 Martha Rosler (born 1943), video, photo-text, installation, performance art
 Suze Rotolo (1943–2011), book artist
 Susan Louise Shatter (1943–2011), landscape painter
 Betty Spindler (born 1943), ceramist
 James Surls (born 1943), sculptor and visual artist 
 James Turrell (born 1943), installation artist
 William Wegman (born 1943), video artist, photographer, painter
 Jerry Wilkerson (1943–2007), painter
 Christopher Wilmarth (1943–1987), sculptor

1944
 Lewis Bryden (born 1944), naturalistic landscapes
 Louis Delsarte (1944–2020), painter
 Don Eddy (born 1944), painter
 Jan Harrison (born 1944), painter and sculptor
 Michael Heizer (born 1944), sculptor, earth artist
 Sanit Khewhok (born 1944), painter and sculptor
 Allan McCollum (born 1944), conceptual artist, sculptor, all media
 Richard Mock (1944–2006), painter
 Thomas Nozkowski(1944–2019), painter
 Susan Mohl Powers (born 1944), sculptor, painter
 Fred H. Roster (1944–2017), sculptor
 Allen Ruppersberg (born 1944), conceptual artist, installation artist
 Alan Saret (born 1944), sculptor

1945
 Michele Oka Doner (born 1945),  sculptor, public artist, printmaker, video artist
 Donray (born 1945), painter
 Sheila Elias (born 1945) 
 Carole Feuerman (born 1945), sculptor
 Charles Fincher (born 1945), cartoonist
 Helen C. Frederick (born 1945), printmaker
 Jack Goldstein (1945–2003), conceptual artist, filmmaker, painter
 Glenda Green (born 1945), painter
 Benjamin Harjo, Jr. (born 1945), painter, printmaker
 Neil Jenney (born 1945), painter
 Charles Hollis Jones (born 1945), furniture designer
 Joseph Kosuth (born 1945), conceptual artist
 Barbara Kruger (born 1945), photographer, graphic artist, sculptor
 Suzanne Lacy (born 1945), installations, video, performance artist
 Robert Lawrance Lobe (born 1945), sculptor
 Paul McCarthy (born 1945), sculptor, installation artist, video artist
 Robert W. Olszewski (born 1945), painter and miniatures artist
 Louise Parks (born 1945), painter
 Peter Reginato (born 1945), sculptor
 Judy Rifka (born 1945), painter, video artist
 Susan Rothenberg (1945–2020), painter, printmaker
 Sean Scully (born 1945), painter, printmaker
 Carol Sutton (born 1945), painter
 Audrey Ushenko (born 1945), realist figurative painter
 Daisy Youngblood (born 1945), ceramic artist, sculptor

1946
 Charles Arnoldi (born 1946), painter
 Dennis Ashbaugh (born 1946), painter
 Alice Aycock (born 1946), sculptor
 Frances Bagley (born 1946), American sculptor
 Jean Bales (1946–2004), painter and printmaker
 Betty Beaumont (born 1946), site-specific artist, all media
 EC Bell (born 1946), painter
 Chris Burden (1946–2015), performance artist, sculptor
 T.C. Cannon (1946–1978), painter
 Dennis H. Farber (1946–2017), painter and photographer
 Don Gummer (born 1946), sculptor
 David Eugene Henry (born 1946), painter, sculptor
 Nabil Kanso (born 1946), painter
 Lev Kublanov (born 1946), graphic artist
 Fran Lew (born 1946), painter
 Robert Mapplethorpe (1946–1989), photographer
 Anthony McCall (born 1946), installation artist, projected film
 Ann McCoy (born 1946), sculpture, drawing
 Anne Neely (born 1946), painter
 Lonnie Ortega (born 1946), aviation artist
 David Reed (born 1946), painter
 Ann Leda Shapiro (born 1946), painter. 
 Marsha Steinberg (born 1946), drawing, etchings, and paintings
 Jamie Wyeth (born 1946), painter
 Bhakti Ziek (born 1946), textiles

1947
 Laurie Anderson (born 1947), experimental performance artist, musician
 Allen 'Big Al' Carter (1947–2008), painter, printmaker, photographer, sculptor
 Sarah Charlesworth (1947–2013), conceptual artist, photographer
 Daniel Kelly (born 1947), painter, printmaker
 Ronnie Landfield (born 1947), painter
 Louise Lawler (born 1947), photographer
 Sherrie Levine (born 1947), conceptual artist
 Richard Minsky (born 1947), bookbinder and cover artist
 Stephen Mueller (1947–2011), painter
 Eduardo Oropeza (1947–2003)
 Linda Ridgway (born 1947), sculptor
 Christine Rosamond (1947–1994), painter
 James Schoppert (1947–1992), Alaskan Native artist
 Larry Stanton (1947–1984) painter
 Bill Stoneham (born 1947), feature film (creature shop), surrealist, illustrator

1948
 Cornelia Breitenbach (1948–1984), textile artist 
 Ronnie Cutrone (1948–2013), painter
 Eric Fischl (born 1948), painter, printmaker
 David Geiser (1948–2020), painter
 Thomas Lanigan-Schmidt (born 1948), installation, collage
 Jonathan Lasker (born 1948), painter
 Ana Mendieta (1948–1985), performance artist
 Meridel Rubenstein (born 1948), photographer and installation artist
 Joseph Sanchez (born 1948), painter and museum curator
 Judith Shea (born 1948), sculptor
 Hollis Sigler (1948–2001), painter, printmaker
 Lizbeth Stewart (1948–2013), ceramist
 Altoon Sultan (born 1948), painter
 J. Craig Thorpe (born 1948), landscape artist
 J. Chris Wilson (born 1948), artist
 Brian Wood (born 1948), film maker, multiple media, painter, photographer

1949
 Ross Bleckner (born 1949), painter
 Deborah Butterfield (born 1949), sculptor
 Stephen Hickman (1949–2021), illustrator, sculptor
 Geoffrey Laurence (born 1949), painter
 Dellamarie Parrilli (born 1949), abstract expressionist, action painter, jewelry designer
 Richard Prince (born 1949), painter, photographer, sculptor
 Archie Rand (born 1949), painter, muralist
 Barbara Schwartz (1949–2006), painter, sculptor
 Laurie Simmons (born 1949), photographer
 Josh Simpson (born 1949), glass artist
 Mark Tansey (born 1949), painter
 Andrea Way (born 1949), painter, sculptor
 Jean Wells (born 1949), mosaic sculptor

Born 1950–1959

1950
 Lesley Dill (born 1950), all media
 Lin Evola (born 1950)
 Margery E. Goldberg (born 1950), painter, sculptor
 Jenny Holzer (born 1950), conceptual artist
 Marilyn Kirsch (born 1950), painter
 Jack Reilly (born 1950), painter
 James Rizzi (1950–2011), painter
 Mary Michael Shelley (born 1950), carver, painter
 Ira Sherman (born 1950), sculptor
 Glennray Tutor (born 1950), painter

1951
 Ned Bittinger (born 1951), painter
 Douglas Bourgeois (born 1951), sculptor and figurative painter
 Lisa Bradley (born 1951), painter
 Louisa Chase (1951–2016), painter
 Philip-Lorca diCorcia (born 1951), photographer
 Mary Heebner (born 1951), painter
 Gary Hill (born 1951), video installation artist
 Lee H. Letts (born 1951), bronze sculptor, goldsmith, and painter
 Melissa Miller (born 1951), painter
 Matt Mullican (born 1951), video, painting, electronic media, and installation
 Joseph Nechvatal (born 1951), digital painter
 Nic Nicosia (born 1951), American art photographer
 James Dean Pruner (1951–1987/1988), painter, printmaker, sculptor
 Julian Schnabel (born 1951), painter, filmmaker
 Peter Shelton (born 1951), American sculptor
 Michael Smith (born 1951), performance, video, and installation artist
 Lynne Woods Turner (born 1951), abstract painter
 Bill Viola (born 1951), video artist
 Russ Warren (born 1951), figurative painter
 William Wolk (born 1951), realist painter

1952
 Chris Campbell (born 1952), painter 
 David Em (born 1952), digital art
 Sonya Fe (born 1952), painter
 Ken Feingold (born 1952), installation artist, all media
 Sam Havadtoy (born 1952), painter, interior designer
 Nicholas Hondrogen (1952–2007), painter
 Cynthia Knott (born 1952), seascapes
 Deborah Nehmad (born 1952), printmaker and mixed-media artist
 John Newman (born 1952), sculptor
 Tom Otterness (born 1952), sculptor
 Lari Pittman (born 1952), painter
 John Pomara (born 1952), abstract artist
 Clifford Ross (born 1952), painter, photographer, video
 David Salle (born 1952), painter
 Linda St. Clair (born 1952), wildlife painter

1953
 Larry Dell Alexander (born 1953), painter
 Debra Bermingham (born 1953), interior scenes and still lifes
 Rebecca Bluestone (born 1953), tapestry weaver
 Sean K. L. Browne (born 1953), sculptor
 James Casebere (born 1953), photographer
 Gordon Chandler (born 1953), sculptor
 Jeff Chapman-Crane (born 1953), painter
 Sean Earley (born 1953), oil painter, commercial illustrator
 April Gornik (born 1953), painter
 Alex Grey (born 1953), artist
 Michael Hafftka (born 1953), painter
 Peter Halley (born 1953), painter
 Malcolm T. Liepke (born 1953), painter
 Robert Longo (born 1953), sculptor, graphic artist
 Sergio Rossetti Morosini (born 1953), painter, sculptor
 Stephen Namara (born 1953), figurative artist
 Tom Nussbaum (born 1953), painter, sculptor, graphic artist
 Charles Ray (born 1953), sculptor
 Geoffrey Raymond (born 1953), painter, executive portraits
 Alexander Tsiaras (born 1953), artist and photojournalist
 Carol Wax (born 1953), printmaker
 Carrie Mae Weems (born 1953), photographer
 Stephen Westfall (born 1953), painter, art critic

1954
 Mary Endico (born 1954), painter, watercolorist
 Robert Gober (born 1954), sculptor
 Joseph Havel (born 1954), sculptor
 Mike Kelley (1954–2012), all media
 Donna Meistrich (born 1954), wax carver, model maker, painter, sculptor, jewelry designer, animator
 Francis X. Pavy (born 1954), painter and sculptor
 Cindy Sherman (born 1954), photographer
 Michael Sherrill (born 1954), ceramist, sculptor
 Kiki Smith (born 1954), sculptor, printmaker, all media
 Randy Souders (born 1954), painter
 Fred Wilson (born 1954), conceptual artist, printmaker
 David Wojnarowicz (1954–1992), painter, photographer

1955
 Katherine Bowling (born 1955), layered landscapes
 Mark Staff Brandl (born 1955), painter, installation artist, art historian
 Charles Fazzino (born 1955), silkscreen serigraph pop artist
 F. Scott Hess (born 1955), painter and conceptual artist
 Roni Horn (born 1955), sculptor, photographer
 Terrell James (born 1955), painter, sculptor
 Karen Kilimnik (born 1955), painter, installation artist
 Jeff Koons (born 1955), sculptor
 Christian Marclay (born 1955), visual artist, composer
 Robert Lyn Nelson (born 1955), marine painter
 Philip Taaffe (born 1955), painter, printmaker
 David Tineo (born 1955), cultural and identity issues artist
 Michael Toombs (born 1955), painter and arts educator
 Jeffrey Vallance (born 1955), conceptual artist
 Karen Wheeler (born 1955), painter
 Richard Wyatt, Jr. (born 1955), painter, muralist

1956
 Mark Beard (born 1956), painter, sculptor, set designer
 Mark Bloch (born 1956), interdisciplinary artist
 F. Lennox Campello (born 1956), visual and multimedia artist
 Kaloust Guedel (born 1956), painter, sculptor
 Julian Hatton (born 1956), painter
 Soraida Martinez (born 1956), painter
 Alison Saar (born 1956), sculptor, installation artist
 Fred Tomaselli (born 1956), painter

1957
 Julie Ault (born 1957), collaborative artist, curator
 Sarah Brayer (born 1957), painter, paper artist, printmaker
 Fred Cray (born 1957), photographer 
 Felix Gonzalez-Torres (1957–1996), sculptor, installation artist, interdisciplinary
 Jim Hodges (1957), sculptor
 Clay Huffman (1957–2001), painter
 Tony Oursler (born 1957), video, performance and installation artist
 Adam Shaw (born 1957), painter
 James Siena (born 1957), painter

1958
 Ben Aronson (born 1958), painter
 Wayne Barlowe (born 1958), science fiction and fantasy painter
 John Dubrow (born 1958), painter
 Lori K. Gordon (born 1958), multi-media artists 
 Keith Haring (1958–1990), graphic artist, muralist, sculptor, printmaker
 Tracy Harris (born 1958), painter
 Wendy W. Jacob (born 1958), sculptor
 Thomas Kinkade (1958–2012), painter
 Christie Repasy (born 1958), floral painter
 James Romberger (born 1958), pastels, comics
 Moses Ros (born 1958), architect, sculptor, painter, printmaker and muralist
 Kenny Scharf (born 1958), painter
 Renee Stout (born 1958), assemblagist
 Ray Turner (born 1958), painter, portraits, landscapes
 Jeff Wassmann (born 1958), assemblage
 Francesca Woodman (1958–1981), photographer

1959
 Ashley Bickerton (born 1959), painter, sculptor
 Laura Bruce (born 1959), artist
 Anne Chu (1959–2016), sculptor
 Donny Johnson (born c. 1959), painter, unconventional technique
 Maya Lin (born 1959), installation artist
 Raymond Persinger (born 1959), sculptor, public artist
 Jerry Weiss (born 1959), painter

Born 1960–1969
1960
 Jean-Michel Basquiat (1960–1988), painter
 Bob Eggleton (born 1960), science fiction, fantasy, and horror artist.
 Laura Ann Jacobs (born 1960), sculptor and mixed media artist.
 MaPo Kinnord (born 1960), ceramic artist, sculptor, and educator.
 Glenn Ligon (born 1960), conceptual artist, all media
 Sono Osato (born 1960), artist
 Jack Pierson (born 1960), sculptor, photographer, other media
 Lorna Simpson (born 1960), photographer
 Tim Tate (born 1960) multimedia sculptor, video artist

1961
 Sam Durant (born 1961), variety of media
 Nestor Hernández (1961–2006), photographer
 Zoe Leonard (born 1961), photographer and visual artist
 Catherine Opie (born 1961), photographer
 Geoffrey C. Smith (born 1961), sculptor
 Rirkrit Tiravanija (born 1961), conceptual artist, installation artist
 Israel Tsvaygenbaum (born 1961), painter

1962
 Daniel Adel (born 1962), painter and illustrator 
 Gregory Crewdson (born 1962), photographer
 John Currin (born 1962), painter
 Monica Aissa Martinez (born 1962), painter
 Renee McGinnis (born 1962), painter
 Rebecca Jo Morales (born 1962), painter
 Laura Myntti (born 1962), painter
 Lisa Yuskavage (born 1962), painter

1963
 Gretchen Baer (born 1963), painter and performance artist
 Rina Banerjee (born 1963), painter
 Kathy Butterly (born 1963), sculptor
 Jon Coffelt (born 1963), painter, sculptor, book arts, curator
 Chris Lattanzio (born 1963), artist
 Paul Henry Ramirez (born 1963), painter
 Spar Street (born 1963), painter and sculptor

1964
 Janine Antoni (born 1964), sculptor, installation artist
 Thomas Arvid (born 1964), oil painter
 Margarete Bagshaw (1964–2015), painter, clay artist
 Meghan Boody (born 1964), surrealist artist
 Rachel Lachowicz (born 1964), painter
 Ray Navarro (1964–1990), artist, filmmaker, and HIV/AIDS activist 
 Jason Teraoka (born 1964), painter
 Erwin Timmers (born 1964), environmental sculptor

1965
 Andrea Fraser (born 1965), performance artist
 Tom Friedman (born 1965), sculptor
 Ellen Gallagher (born 1965), painter, mixed media artist
 Elizabeth Peyton (born 1965), painter
 Jason Rhoades (1965–2006), installation artist
 Paul Rusconi (born 1965), painter, mixed media artist
 Brian Rutenberg (born 1965), abstract painter
 Andrea Zittel (born 1965), sculptor, installation artist

1966
 Margaret Boozer (born 1966), ceramist
 Bela Borsodi, (born 1966), photographer 
 Charlie Bynar, (born 1966), watercolorist
 Susanne Crane (born 1966), Minnesota artist
 Rachel Harrison (born 1966), sculptor, photographer
 Annette P. Jimerson (born 1966), painter
 Josiah McElheny (born 1966), sculptor, glass artist
 Ivan Morley (born 1966), painter
 Ranu Mukherjee (born 1966), multimedia artist
 Roxy Paine (born 1966), sculptor, kinetic art
 Jonathan Podwil (born 1966), painter

1967
 Matthew Barney (born 1967), multimedia artist, sculptor, filmmaker
 Geoffrey Chadsey (born 1967), painter and draftsman
 Harrell Fletcher (born 1967), socially engaged interdisciplinary projects
 Davyd Whaley (1967–2014), painter

1968
 Doug Aitken (born 1968), multimedia artist
 Dave Halili (born 1968), painter, illustrator, and designer of album covers, posters, and graphic merchandise
 Amanda Matthews (born 1968), sculptor, painter, public art designer
 Manuel Rivera-Ortiz (born 1968), documentary photographer
 Andrew Cornell Robinson (born 1968), sculptor, ceramist, painter, printmaker
 
1969
 Inka Essenhigh (born 1969), painter
 Matt Kish (born 1969), artist, illustrator, book cover illustrator
 Kara Walker (born 1969), collage artist, painter, printmaker, installation artist

Born 1970–1979

1970
 Noah Becker (born 1970), painter, Whitehot Magazine publisher, saxophonist
 Bob Coronato (born 1970), painter and printmaker
 Clandestine Culture (born 1970), painter, multidisciplinary artist
 Shepard Fairey (born 1970), painter, printmaker, illustrator and muralist
 Susie Frazier (born 1970), mixed media
 Ron Laboray (born 1970), conceptual art and painting
 John Newsom (born 1970), painter

1971
 Michael Birawer (born 1971), surrealist urban settings painter
 Paul Kremer (born 1971), artist
 Andrew Prokos (born 1971), photographer
 John Waguespack (born 1971), artist
 Logan Hicks (born 1971), artist
1972
 Jules de Balincourt, (born 1972), French-American nationality, painter
 J Stoner Blackwell, (born 1972), American mixed media artist 
 Letitia Huckaby (born 1972), photographer, mixed media
 Monika Steiner (born 1972), artist and sculptor
 Kelly Sueda (born 1972), painter
 Erick Swenson (born 1972), sculptor
 Charlie White (born 1972), photographer

1973
 Hayley Barker (born 1973), painter and drawer, spiritual experience, landscape, ritual
 Violet Hopkins (born 1973), painter
 Pearl C. Hsiung (born 1973), mixed media
 Rosy Lamb (born 1973), painter and sculptor based in Paris

1974
 Carrie Ann Baade (born 1974), painter
 Jason D'Aquino (born 1974)
 Lee Kohse (born 1974), painter
 Marni Kotak (born 1974), performance artist
 Aaron Padilla (born 1974), ceramist and woodworker
 John Ross Palmer (born 1974), painter
 Willy Bo Richardson (born 1974), painter

1975
 Lauren Fensterstock (born 1975), installation artist, sculptor, goldsmith 
 Jessica Todd Harper (born 1975), portrait photographer 
 Adreon Henry (born 1975), artist
 Sedrick Huckaby (born 1975), painter 
 Elliott Johnson (born 1975), painter and designer 
 Patrick McGrath Muñíz (born 1975), painter
 Greg Simkins (born 1975), painter

1976
 Seamus Conley (born 1976), artist
 Marlon Forrester (born 1976), painter and educator
 Mathew Hintz (born 1976), impressionist painter and drawer
 Casey McKee (born 1976), artist
 William Powhida (born 1976), drawing

1977
 Becca Bernstein (born 1977), painter
 Eric Daigh (born 1977), mixed media 
 David Herbert (born 1977), sculpture, installation and video
 Tim Lokiec (born 1977), 2-D mixed media
 Vadis Turner (born 1977), mixed media
 Lesley Vance, painter

1978
 Hernan Bas (born 1978), painter
 John Kleckner (born 1978), painter
 Chad Person (born 1978), sculptor and collage artist

1979
 Rachel Bess (born c. 1979), painter
 Evan Gruzis (born 1979), painter
 Jimmy Kuehnle (born 1979), sculpture, performance and installation
 Tameka Norris (born 1979), performance artist

Born 1980–1989

1980
 Kadar Brock (born 1980), abstract artist
 Sarah Beth Goncarova (born 1980), painter, sculptor and installation artist
 Richard T. Scott (born 1980), painter
 Michael Tarbi (born 1980), artist
 Lindsey White (born 1980), visual artist, photography, video, sculpture, and book making

1981
 Rafa Esparza (born 1981), performance artist
 Dash Snow (1981–2009), artist
 Francesca DiMattio (born 1981), artist
 Sean Raspet (born 1981), artist
 Wendy Red Star (born 1981), multimedia artist

1982
 Heather Dewey-Hagborg, information artist and bio-hacker
 Wu Tsang (born 1982), filmmaker, performance artist

1983
 Liza Sylvestre, visual artist from Minneapolis, Minnesota

1986
 Aleah Chapin (born 1986), portrait painter
 Alexa Meade (born 1986), body artist
 Brenna Murphy (born 1986), psychedelic visual forms combined with three-dimensional object

1987

 Lauren Silva (born 1987), painter

1988
 Everitte Barbee (born 1988), artist, Arabic calligrapher

1989
 American Artist (born 1989), new media and installation artist
 Ari Glass (born 1989), painter, designer and musician

Born 1990–1999

1990
 Matt Wisniewski (born 1990), collage artist and photographer
 Clotilde Jiménez, (born 1990), American artist
1992
 George Pocheptsov, painter and draughtsman

1995
 Patricia Renee' Thomas, painter, draftswoman, and art educator

Born 2000-present

Date of birth unknown

 Michele Banks, painter
 Aisha Tandiwe Bell, mixed media
 Rora Blue, installation, text-based, and interactive
 Dorothy Braudy, artist
 Charlot Byj, greeting card and advertising artist
 Nancy Calef, figurative painter
 Sheila Cameron, artist and graphic designer
 Pritika Chowdhry, artist
 Adam Cooley, painter and sculptor
 Rosetta DeBerardinis, painter
 David Dewey, watercolor landscapes
 Michael D. Fay, war and combat artist
 Chawky Frenn, painter and art professor
 MK Guth, installation artist
 Scott Jacobs, photorealism
 Hedy Klineman, celebrity portraits
 Llanakila, painter and digital artist
 Don H. Marr, painter, romantic realism and sociocomic surrealism
 Scape Martinez, abstract artist and muralist
 Anado McLauchlin, artist
 Betty Merken, painter and printmaker, abstract geometric monotypes
 John Randall Nelson, painter and sculptor
 Pamela Nelson, contemporary painter and installation artist
 Hal Olsen, artist
 Chitra Ramanathan, contemporary abstract painter
 David Wells Roth, figurative painter
 Diane Tuckman, silk painter
 Pheoris West, artist

See also 

 American Art
 Native American artists
 African American art
 List of African-American visual artists
 Sculpture of the United States
 Feminist Art Movement
 Hudson River School
 Luminism
 American Impressionism
 Ashcan School
 Precisionism
 American scene painting
 Regionalism
 WPA Federal Art Project
 Northwest School
 Abstract Expressionism
 Pop Art
 Happenings
 Fluxus
 Intermedia
 The Kitsch Movement
 Hard-edge painting
 Minimalism
 Post-painterly Abstraction
 Color Field Painting
 Post-Minimalism
 Process Art
 Site-specific art
 Earth Art
 Lyrical Abstraction
 Photorealism
 Conceptual Art
 Postmodernism

References 

1900 and after
American artists